is the eighth Japanese single release from Hitomi Yaida. It is also the third single taken from the album I/flancy.

It peaked at number ten in the charts on December 14, 2002.

Track listing

Notes

2002 singles
Hitomi Yaida songs
2002 songs
EMI Music Japan singles
Songs written by Hitomi Yaida